The 1985 France rugby union tour of South America was a series of matches played in June 1985 in South America by France national rugby union team.

Matches 
Complete list of matches played by France in South America:

 Test matches

Notes

References

1985 rugby union tours
1985
1985
1985
1985
Argentina–France sports relations
Brazil–France relations
France–Uruguay relations
1984–85 in French rugby union
1985 in Argentine rugby union
rugby union
rugby union